Hema Prabhath, also known professionally as Hema Panchamukhi, is an Indian actress known for her work in Kannada cinema. Some of the films of Hema Prabhath as an actress include America! America!! (1997), Dore (1995), Ravimama (1999), Golibar (1993) (child actress).

Hema teaches dance to students in theater group, Prabhath Kalavidaru. She has her own dance academy known as Sukrutees which is almost 20 years old. She has over 100 students who learn dance under her. 
She made a comeback in the industry through the series Raksha Bandhana aired on colours in 2019.

Personal life
Hema is married to Prashanth G Shastry since 2017 and the couple are the parents of a daughter born in 2018  Hema was earlier married to Sumindra Panchamukhi and settled in America. The couple had one daughter. After filing for divorce Hema returned to Bangalore, changed her surname back to Prabhath and started a dance school.

Filmography

See also

List of people from Karnataka
Cinema of Karnataka
List of Indian film actresses

References

External links

Actresses in Kannada cinema
Living people
Kannada people
Actresses from Karnataka
Indian film actresses
21st-century Indian actresses
Year of birth missing (living people)